Deveaux Bank is a horseshoe-shaped sand spit island encompassing a  bird sanctuary at the mouth of the North Edisto River in Charleston County, South Carolina. It is located on the Atlantic Coast between Edisto Island, South Carolina and Seabrook Island, South Carolina. Its average elevation is three feet.

History
Deveaux bank was first documented in 1921 and by the 1930s was an established seabird rookery.  During World War II, Deveaux Bank was used as a bombing range.  The bank was completely submerged by Hurricane David in 1979 and tidal shifts that followed the next spring.  Over the next several years the island continued to rebuild as sand was deposited by currents.

Today
Currents cause the shape of the island to constantly shift.  Due to a lack of land predators, the island has become a heavily utilized bird nesting area.  It is protected by the South Carolina Department of Natural Resources.  Landings may only be done below the high-water line.  Dogs are prohibited and overnight camping is also prohibited.

Flora
Plant species on the island include:
Russian thistle, Echinops exaltatus
marsh hay
camphorweed
beach elder
beach tea
dog fennel

Fauna
Observed species vary from year-to-year but include:
Brown pelican
Royal tern
Least tern
Wilson's plover
Sandwich tern
Black skimmer
Tricolored heron
Snowy egret
Great egret
Gull-billed tern
Willet
American oystercatcher
Laughing gull
Ibis
Hudsonian whimbrel

References

Islands of South Carolina
Spits of the United States
Coastal islands of South Carolina